Lecythis prancei is a species of woody plant in the family Lecythidaceae. It is found only in Brazil. It is threatened by habitat loss.

References

prancei
Flora of Brazil
Endangered plants
Taxonomy articles created by Polbot